José Antonio Díaz may refer to:

 Antonio Díaz (boxer), full name José Antonio Díaz (born 1976), Mexican world champion boxer
 José Antonio Caro (footballer, born 1994), full name José Antonio Caro Díaz, Spanish footballer
 José Antonio Díaz (fencer) (born 1938), Cuban Olympic fencer
 José Antonio Díaz García (born 1964), Mexican politician
Joey Diaz (comedian), full name José Antonio "Joey Coco" Díaz (born 1963), American comedian and actor